NT1 may refer to:

 TFX (TV channel), formerly NT1, a French television channel
 Network termination 1 in digital telephony
 New Standard D-29, U.S. Navy trainer designated "NT-1"